State Route 260 (SR 260), also known as Browning Branch Road, is an east–west secondary highway that is located entirely in Trousdale County in Middle Tennessee, United States. Its western terminus is located at a junction with US 231 near the Sumner County line, and it ends at SR 141 just north of Hartsville.

Even though SR 260 is designated as a secondary highway, there are various signs along the highway stating it is a primary highway.

Route description

SR 260 traverses entirely rural areas as a 2-lane highway. It serves as a connector between US 231/SR 376 and SR 141 just north of Hartsville. It goes through farmland as it traces along the edge of the Highland Rim.

Major intersections

See also

 List of state routes in Tennessee
 List of highways numbered 260

References

External links

260
260